James McEwan or MacEwan may refer to:
Jamie McEwan (1952–2014), American slalom canoeist
James MacEwan (died 1911), priest
James B. McEwan (1855–1915), American politician
Jimmy McEwan (1929–2017), Scottish footballer

See also
James McEwen (disambiguation)